Flowers for Algernon is a short story by American author Daniel Keyes, later expanded by him into a novel and subsequently adapted for film and other media. The short story, written in 1958 and first published in the April 1959 issue of The Magazine of Fantasy & Science Fiction, won the Hugo Award for Best Short Story in 1960. The novel was published in 1966 and was joint winner of that year's Nebula Award for Best Novel (with Babel-17).

Algernon is a laboratory mouse who has undergone surgery to increase his intelligence. The story is told by a series of progress reports written by Charlie Gordon, the first human subject for the surgery, and it touches on ethical and moral themes such as the treatment of the mentally disabled.

Although the book has often been challenged for removal from libraries in the United States and Canada, sometimes successfully, it is frequently taught in schools around the world and has been adapted many times for television, theater, radio and as the Academy Award-winning film Charly.

Background

The ideas for Flowers for Algernon developed over 14 years and were inspired by events in Keyes's life, starting in 1945 with Keyes's conflict with his parents, who were pushing him through a pre-medical education despite his desire to pursue a writing career. Keyes felt that his education was driving a wedge between himself and his parents, and this led him to wonder what would happen if it were possible to increase a person's intelligence.

A pivotal moment occurred in 1957 while Keyes was teaching English to students with special needs, and one of them asked if it would be possible for the student to be put into an ordinary class (mainstreamed) if he worked hard and became smart. Keyes also witnessed the dramatic change in another learning-disabled student who regressed after he was removed from regular lessons. Keyes said that "When he came back to school, he had lost it all. He could not read. He reverted to what he had been. It was a heart-breaker."

Characters in the book were based on people in Keyes's life. The character of Algernon was inspired by a university dissection class, and the name was inspired by the poet Algernon Charles Swinburne. Nemur and Strauss, the scientists who develop the intelligence-enhancing surgery in the story, were based on professors Keyes met while in graduate school.

In 1958, Keyes was approached by Galaxy Science Fiction magazine to write a story, at which point the elements of Flowers for Algernon fell into place. When the story was submitted to Galaxy, however, editor Horace Gold suggested changing the ending so that Charlie retained his intelligence, married Alice Kinnian, and lived happily ever after. Keyes refused to make the change and sold the story to The Magazine of Fantasy & Science Fiction instead.

Keyes worked on the expanded novel between 1962 and 1965 and first tried to sell it to Doubleday, but they also wanted to change the ending. Again, Keyes refused and gave Doubleday back their advance. Five publishers rejected the story over the course of a year until it was published by Harcourt in 1966.

Publication history
The short story "Flowers for Algernon" was first published as the lead story in the April 1959 issue of The Magazine of Fantasy & Science Fiction. It was later reprinted in The Best from Fantasy and Science Fiction, 9th series (1960), the Fifth Annual of the Year's Best Science Fiction (1960), Best Articles and Stories (1961), Literary Cavalcade (1961), The Science Fiction Hall of Fame, Volume One, 1929–1964 (1970), and The Magazine of Fantasy & Science Fiction: A 30-Year Retrospective (1980). 

The Magazine of Fantasy & Science Fiction reprinted the original short story in its May 2000 issue along with an essay titled "Algernon, Charlie and I: A Writer's Journey" by the author. The magazine's cover announced the combination with "Flowers for Algernon / Daniel Keyes / the story and its origin".

The expanded novel was first published in 1966 by Harcourt Brace with the Bantam paperback following in 1968.  the novel had not been out of print since its publication. By 2004, it had been translated into 27 languages, published in 30 countries and sold more than 5 million copies.

Synopsis
The short story and the novel share many similar plot points, but the novel expands significantly on Charlie's developing emotional state as well as his intelligence, his memories of childhood, and the relationship with his family. Both are presented as a series of journal entries ("progress reports") written by the protagonist, Charlie Gordon. The style, grammar, spelling, and punctuation of these reports reflect changes in his mental and emotional growth.

Short story
Charlie Gordon is a man with an IQ of 68 who works a menial job as a janitor at a factory, and is attending a literacy program taught by Ms. Kinnian. He is selected to undergo an experimental surgical technique to increase his intelligence. The technique had already been tested on a number of animals; the great success was with Algernon, a laboratory mouse. The surgery on Charlie is also a success, and his IQ triples.

He realizes his co-workers at the factory, whom he thought were his friends, only liked having him around so they could tease him. His new intelligence frightens his co-workers, and they start a petition to have him fired. As Charlie's intelligence peaks, Algernon's suddenly declines—he loses his increased intelligence and mental age, and dies afterward, buried in the back yard of Charlie's home. Charlie realizes his intelligence increase is also temporary. He begins researching to find the flaw in the experiment, which he calls the "Algernon–Gordon Effect". When he finishes his work, his intelligence regresses to its original state. Charlie is aware of, and pained by, what is happening to him as he loses his knowledge and his ability to read and write. He resumes his old job as a janitor at the factory and tries to go back to how things used to be, but he cannot stand the pity from his co-workers, his landlady, and Ms. Kinnian. Charlie states he plans to "go away" from New York. His last wish is for someone to put flowers on Algernon's grave.

Novel
The novel opens with an epigraph taken from Book VII of Plato's The Republic:

Charlie Gordon, 32  years old, demonstrates an IQ of 68. His uncle has arranged for him to hold a menial job at a bakery so that he will not have to live at the Warren State Home and Training School, a state institution. Desiring to improve himself, Charlie attends reading and writing classes, taught by Miss Alice Kinnian, at the Beekman College Center for Retarded Adults. Two researchers at Beekman, Professor Nemur and Dr. Strauss, are looking for a human test subject on whom to try a new surgical technique intended to increase intelligence. They have already performed the surgery on a mouse named Algernon, resulting in a dramatic improvement in his mental performance. Based on Alice's recommendation and his motivation to improve, Nemur and Strauss choose Charlie over smarter pupils to undergo the procedure.

The operation is successful, and within the next three months Charlie's IQ reaches 185. At the same time, he begins recalling his childhood and remembers that his mother Rose physically abused him and wasted money on fake treatments for his disability, while his younger sister Norma resented him. As Charlie's intelligence, education, and understanding of the world increase, his relationships with people deteriorate. His co-workers at the bakery, who used to amuse themselves at his expense, now fear and resent his increased intelligence and persuade his boss to fire him. Alice enters a relationship with Charlie but breaks up with him after she realizes she can no longer relate to him and claims his intelligence has changed his personality. Later, Charlie loses trust in Strauss and, particularly, Nemur, believing that they considered him a laboratory subject and not human before the operation. While at a scientific convention in Chicago, Charlie feels humiliated when he is treated like an experiment and, in retaliation, flees with Algernon.

After moving to Manhattan with Algernon, Charlie becomes involved in a relationship with Fay Lillman, his neighbor, to sate his loneliness. After an incident with a disabled busboy, Charlie becomes inspired to continue and improve Nemur and Strauss's experiment and applies for a grant. However, he notices Algernon is beginning to behave erratically. Throughout his research, he discovers a flaw behind Nemur and Strauss's procedure indicating that he will lose his intelligence and, possibly, regress back to a primitive state. While still holding onto his intelligence, Charlie publishes his findings as the "Algernon–Gordon effect", as Algernon dies.

As Charlie begins to regress to his former mental state, he finds closure with his family. Rose, who still lives in the family's old home in Brooklyn, has developed dementia and recognizes him only briefly; his father Matt, who broke off contact with the family years earlier, does not recognize him at all. He is only able to reconnect with Norma, who is now caring for Rose in their newly depressed neighborhood, but declines to stay with them. Charlie begins dating Alice again, but his frustration with losing intelligence eventually causes him to end his relationships with her and Dr. Strauss. Unable to bear the thought of being dependent and pitied by his friends and co-workers, he decides to live at the Warren State Home and Training School, where no one knows about the operation. In a final postscript to his writings, he requests that someone put flowers on Algernon's grave in the backyard of Charlie's former residence.

Style
Both the novel and the short story are written in an epistolary style collecting together Charlie's personal "progress reports" from a few days before the operation until his final regression. Initially, the reports are filled with spelling errors and awkwardly constructed sentences. Following the operation, however, the reports begin to show marked improvements in spelling, grammar, punctuation, and diction, indicating a rise in his intelligence. Charlie's regression is conveyed by the loss of these skills.

Themes
Important themes in Flowers for Algernon include the treatment of the mentally disabled, the impact on happiness of the conflict between intellect and emotion, and how events in the past can influence a person later in life. Algernon is an example of a story that incorporates the science-fiction theme of uplift.

Reception
Algis Budrys of Galaxy Science Fiction praised Flowers for Algernons realistic depiction of people as "rounded characters". Stating in August 1966 that Keyes had published little fiction and whether he would publish more was unknown, he concluded "If this is a beginning, then what a beginning it is, and if it is the high point in a very short career, then what a career". In February 1967 Budrys named the book the best novel of the year.

Awards
The original short story won the Hugo Award for Best Short Story in 1960. The expanded novel was joint winner of the Nebula Award for Best Novel in 1966, tied with Babel-17 by Samuel R. Delany, and was nominated for the Hugo Award for Best Novel in 1967, losing out to The Moon Is a Harsh Mistress by Robert A. Heinlein.

In the late 1960s, the Science Fiction Writers of America (SFWA) decided to give Nebula Awards retroactively and voted for their favourite science fiction stories of the era ending December 31, 1964 (before the Nebula Award was conceived). The short story version of Flowers for Algernon was voted third out of 132 nominees and was published in The Science Fiction Hall of Fame, Volume One, 1929–1964 in 1970. Keyes was elected the SFWA Author Emeritus in 2000 for making a significant contribution to science fiction and fantasy, primarily as a result of Flowers for Algernon.

Censorship
Flowers for Algernon is on the American Library Association's list of the 100 Most Frequently Challenged Books of 1990–1999 at number 43. The reasons for the challenges vary, but usually center on those parts of the novel in which Charlie struggles to understand and express his sexual desires. Many of the challenges have proved unsuccessful, but the book has occasionally been removed from school libraries, including some in Pennsylvania and Texas.

In January 1970, the school board of Cranbrook, British Columbia, as well as Calgary, Alberta, removed the Flowers for Algernon novel from the local age 14–15 curriculum and the school library, after a parent complained that it was "filthy and immoral". The president of the British Columbia Teachers' Federation criticised the action. Flowers for Algernon was part of the British Columbia Department of Education list of approved books for grade nine and was recommended by the British Columbia Secondary Association of Teachers of English. A month later, the board reconsidered and returned the book to the library; they did not, however, lift its ban from the curriculum.

Influence
Flowers for Algernon has been the inspiration for works that include the album A Curious Feeling by Genesis keyboardist Tony Banks. It also inspired the 2006 modern dance work Holeulone by Karine Pontiès, which won the Prix de la Critique de la Communauté française de Belgique for best dance piece. A 2001 episode of the TV series The Simpsons titled "HOMR" has a plot similar to the novel. A 2013 episode of the TV series It's Always Sunny in Philadelphia titled "Flowers for Charlie" is heavily based on the novel.
The name Algernon inspired the author Iain Cameron Williams to create his poetic work The Empirical Observations of Algernon after Williams's father had nicknamed him Algernon as a teenager (taken from Flowers for Algernon) due to his son's highly inquisitive nature.

Critical response
As a novel, Flowers for Algernon was ahead of its time and explores themes that remain relevant to this day. Critic Mike Ryder describes it as "a complex and deeply moving novel that actively engages with biopolitical concepts and amorphous subjectivities, blending the human, the animal and the machine", linking the novel with the philosophy of Gilles Deleuze and Giorgio Agamben.

Adaptations 

Flowers for Algernon has been adapted many times for different media including stage, screen, and radio. These adaptations include:

 A 1961 episode of the television drama The United States Steel Hour, "The Two Worlds of Charlie Gordon", starring Cliff Robertson.
 A 1968 film, Charly, also starring Cliff Robertson, for which he won the Academy Award for Best Actor.
 A 1975 stage play, Entaha El-Dars Ya Ghabi (The Lesson is Over, Stupid) by Egyptian actor Mohamed Sobhi
 A 1969 stage play, Flowers for Algernon by David Rogers.
 A 1978 stage musical, Charlie and Algernon by David Rogers and Charles Strouse.
A 1979 rock opera, A Curious Feeling by Tony Banks.
 A 1991 radio play, Flowers for Algernon, for BBC Radio 4 starring Tom Courtenay.
 A 2000 television film, Flowers for Algernon, starring Matthew Modine.
 A 2001 episode of the television series The Simpsons, "HOMR."
 A 2001 episode of the television series The Invisible Man, "Flowers for Hobbes".
A 2001 Spider-Man comic story, "Flowers for Rhino", by Peter Milligan and Duncan Fregredo.
 A 2002 Japanese drama, Algernon ni Hanataba o for Fuji Television, starring Yūsuke Santamaria.
 A 2006 French television film, Des fleurs pour Algernon.
 A 2013 episode of the television series It's Always Sunny in Philadelphia, "Flowers for Charlie".
 A 2013 episode of the television series The League, "Flowers for Taco".
 A 2015 Japanese drama, Algernon ni Hanataba o for Tokyo Broadcasting System, starring Yamashita Tomohisa and Chiaki Kuriyama.
 A 2020 episode of the television series Curb Your Enthusiasm, "Beep Panic".

Further stage and radio adaptations have been produced in France (1982), Ireland (1983), Australia (1984), Poland (1985), Japan (1987, 1990), and Czechoslovakia (1988).

References

Sources

External links
 
 
 "Flowers for Algernon" on the Internet Archive

1959 short stories
1966 American novels
1966 science fiction novels
American novels adapted into films
American science fiction novels
Censored books
Censorship in Canada
Epistolary novels
Fictional diaries
Hugo Award for Best Short Story winning works
Human experimentation in fiction
Nebula Award for Best Novel-winning works
Science fiction novels adapted into films
Science fiction short stories
Works originally published in The Magazine of Fantasy & Science Fiction